Victoria Bach (born July 12, 1996) is a Canadian women's ice hockey player with the Professional Women's Hockey Players Association (PWHPA) and the Canadian national team. A graduate of Boston University, she was the first player in the Terriers' women's ice hockey program to score more than 100 goals. She played in the CWHL with the Markham Thunder, and received the CWHL's 2018-2019 Rookie of the Year award.

Playing career

University 

Across 145 NCAA games, Bach scored 198 points, setting all-time points and goals record for Boston University. She was the first woman in the university's history to score 100 career goals. In her senior year, she tallied 67 points in 33 games.

Bach won the Hockey East Rookie of the Year in 2014–2015. She was the second Terrier player to win the award in the program's history; teammate Marie-Philip Poulin won the award in 2010–2011. She was a Hockey East First Team All-Star in 2017 and 2018, and was a top-3 finalist for the 2018 Patty Kazmaier Award.

Professional 
In 2017, Bach was selected 7th overall by the Metropolitan Riveters in the NWHL draft. She was then selected by the Markham Thunder in the 1st round of the 2018 CWHL Draft, the team with whom she would sign her first professional contract. In 2018–19, she won the CWHL Rookie of the Year Award, putting up 32 points in 26 games with Markham, her 19 goals good for second in the league.

After the collapse of the CWHL in May 2019, she joined the PWHPA, where she currently practices with the GTA East group.

International 
Bach played for Team Canada at the 2014 IIHF World Women's U18 Championship, winning a gold medal. She made her debut for the senior Canada women's national ice hockey team at the 2017 4 Nations Cup. She then served as assistant captain for the country at the 2018 4 Nations Cup. In the 2019-2020 Team Canada season, Victoria was promoted to play on a line with Marie-Philip Poulin.  During the 2019-2020 Rivalry Series, she was the top scoring Canadian player. She was named to the Canadian World Champhionships roster for the first time in 2020, before the tournament was cancelled due to the COVID-19 pandemic. She was one of 28 players invited to Hockey Canada's Centralization Camp, which represents the selection process for the Canadian women's team that shall compete in Ice hockey at the 2022 Winter Olympics.

Personal life 

Bach was born in Ontario, Canada. Member of the Mohawks of the Bay of Quinte, First Nation. As a young woman, she started playing soccer; she switched to hockey after watching Team Canada win the gold medal in women's ice hockey at the 2002 Winter Olympic Games.

At Boston University she completed a bachelor's degree in communication.

Career statistics

External links

References

1996 births
Canadian women's ice hockey forwards
Ice hockey people from Ontario
Living people
Markham Thunder players
Boston University Terriers women's ice hockey players
Professional Women's Hockey Players Association players